Aldo Cláudio Felipe Bonadei, also known as Aldo Bonadei (June 17,
1906 in São Paulo – January 16, 1974 in São Paulo) was a Brazilian painter of Italian descent.

Early life
Between 1923 and 1928, Aldo studied with Brazilian academic painter Pedro Alexandrino and frequently visited the studio of Italian painters Antonio Rocco and Amadeo Scavone who also lived in São Paulo. During this period, he studied at the Liceu de Artes e Oficios de São Paulo, where he took courses on sketching and Fine Arts.

Italian Influence
In the beginning of the 1930s, Aldo decided to move to Florence to attend the Florence Academy of Arts (Accademia di Belle Arti di Firenze) where he trained as a painter with the Italian artists Felice Carena and Ennio Pozzi. When he returned from Italy, Aldo shared his studio with other fellow artists such as Francisco Rebollo, Alfredo Volpi, Mario Zanini, Manuel Martins and Fulvio Penacchi, forming group that later became known as Grupo Santa Helena.

A Pioneers School
In 1949, Aldo began to teach at what became the first school of Modern Art in São Paulo, Escola Livre de Artes Plásticas. His varied interests led him to work in poetry, fashion and theater.  He was culturally important in the 1930s and 1940s, when modern art burgeoned in Brazil, becoming a pioneer of Brazilian abstract art.

At the end of the 1950s, Aldo worked as costume designer for Nydia Lícia & Sérgio Cardoso company, and in two films by Walter Hugo Khoury.

References 

 Cronologia
 Exposição online
 Obra A leitura
 Natureza morta
 Obra Morro de Ubatuba
 Obra Flores
 Exposição no Museu de Arte Contemporânea da USP
 Natureza Morta, 1951
 Árvores, 1949
 Relatório Fapesp 2006

1906 births
1974 deaths
Modern artists
Brazilian people of Italian descent
20th-century Brazilian painters
20th-century Brazilian male artists